Little Wizard Tao is a children's adventure fantasy animated television series co-produced by South Korean G&G Entertainment and Chinese animation studio Motion Magic Digital Studios. The series was originally aired on KBS2 and later distributed to markets in China, Hong Kong, Great Britain and France. Little Wizard Tao premiered on 13 July 2009 and concluded season 1 on 26 April 2010. The series focuses on Tao, a young boy with magical powers, as he attends school to become a wizard.

In 2013, it was also aired on KBS World with Little Wizard Tao Season 2 also airing in 2014.

Episodes

Season 1

Season 2

Characters
 Tao is the seven-year-old adventure-loving protagonist of the series. He is the descendant of a powerful ancient wizard. Before receiving his invitation to attend the magic school, Tao lived with his grandfather. At school, Tao aims to become a great wizard. Tao has a magical paintbrush which turns everything he draws into real objects. Tao also has a soft spot for Jasmine.
 Jasmin (Xiaoming) is Tao's best friend. She is a good, kind-hearted student who is an advocate for truth and justice. Jasmin has healing powers and does not support violence. Jasmin also has a soft spot for Tao. 
 Polley is a student whose power is shapeshifting into a fox. Polley typically only says three phrases: "good idea", "bad idea" and "no idea".
 Kiki is a nerdy student and science-enthusiast. He wears mechanical arms on his back.
 Sheldon (Xiuying) is a boastful, arrogant student and Tao's rival. He is to create and control fire.
 Mumu is a monkey who attends the magic school. He practices kung fu and wears a jumpsuit with the image of a banana on it.
 Pingus and Pongus Peng are penguin brothers who have power over ice. They both failed the past three years at school.

Minor characters
 Principal Lao is the principal of the school. When he was a student, he was the greatest wizard in the world.
 Professor Sonn-Sonn is a monkey who teaches P.E. class. His cousin is a great kung fu wizard.
 Professor Bao teaches chemistry and magic history.
 Professor May-Ann teaches musica, she is also the school nurse.
 Professor Griffe's subject is unknown, however, he has the power of invisibility.
 Grandma Owl is an owl who is the dorm mistress, known for her bad temper.
 Dodo is a fairy who looks after the school garden. She is intolerant of any mischief the students try to cause.
 Tao's grandfather looked after Tao before Tao moved to magic school. He enjoys gardening but misses Tao greatly.
 Dung Dung is Tao's childhood friend. He helps Tao's grandfather look after his garden. Sometimes he visits Tao at the magic school.
 Pedh Baba is a talking tree who guards a magical pond. The water from the pond is said to heal any wound.
 Turtle School Bus is a giant flying turtle. A seating area is attached on his back, he acts as the school bus.

References

External links
Official website 
Little Wizard Tao at the Korean Movie Database

2009 South Korean television series debuts
2010 South Korean television series endings
2010s South Korean animated television series
2000s South Korean animated television series
Chinese children's animated adventure television series
Chinese children's animated fantasy television series
South Korean children's animated adventure television series
South Korean children's animated fantasy television series
Animated television series about children